The Asian Conference on Electrochemical Power Sources (ACEPS) is a series of scientific conferences focusing on electrochemical power sources that is held in East Asia, Southeast Asia and South Asia at different locations each time. It was initiated by Professor Zempachi Ogumi in Japan in 2006, and has subsequently been held in China (2007), South Korea (2008), Taiwan (2009), Singapore (2010), India (2012), Japan (2013), China (2015), Korea (2017), and Taiwan (2019). The next meeting will be held in Singapore (Postpone to 2022).

Background
The First Asian Conference on Electrochemical Power Sources (ACEPS-1) was held November 15–17, 2006, in Kyoto, Japan, with the aim of strengthening regional research potential and improving infrastructures in the Asian region. ACEPS promotes collaboration and co-operation between Asian scientists in the fields of fuel cells, storage batteries, super capacitors and electrochemical science.

Conferences 
Up to now, seven meetings have been held:
 ACEPS-1, November 15–17, 2006, Kyoto, Japan
 ACEPS-2, October 21–23, 2007, Fudan University, Shanghai, China
 ACEPS-3, November, 2008, Korea University, Seoul, South Korea
 ACEPS-4, November 8–12, 2009, National Taiwan University of Science and Technology, Taipei, Taiwan
 ACEPS-5, September 17–20, 2010, Singapore
 ACEPS-6, January 5–8, 2012, Indian Institute of Science and Central Electro Chemical Research Institute, India
 ACEPS-7, November 24–27, 2013, Co-Sponsored by Electrochemical Society of Japan and Chemical Society of Japan,
 ACEPS-8, August 21–25, 2015, Co-Sponsored by  Fudan University, Shanghai, China,
 ACEPS-9, August 20–23, 2017, Gyeongju, South Korea,
 ACPES-10, November 24–27, 2019, Kaohsiung, Taiwan,

References 

Recurring events established in 2006
Academic conferences
Electrochemistry